The Northern Arizona Lumberjacks college football team represents Northern Arizona University in the Big Sky Conference (Big Sky). The Lumberjacks compete as part of the National Collegiate Athletic Association (NCAA) Division I Football Championship Subdivision.

Hired in 2019, Chris Ball is Northern Arizona's current head coach.

Head coaches 
The following are the head coaches of the Lumberjacks.
 Clarence Thorpe (1915–1917)
 R. A. Fuller (1918)
 L. T. Lawyer (1919)
 McVey & Lacey Eastburn (1920)
 R. H. Drake (1921–1922)
 Robert G. Stevenson (1923)
 W. E. Rogers (1924)
 Talbert D. Jessuppe (1925)
 Emzy Harvey Lynch (1926–1927)
 Rudy Lavik (1928–1932)
 Ira MacIntosh (1933–1936)
 Garrett Arbelbide (1937–1939)
 Maurice Moulder (1940–1942)
 Frank Brickey (1943–1946)
 Nick Ragus (1947–1948)
 Emil Ladyko (1949)
 Ben Reiges (1950)
 John Pederson (1951–1953)
 Earl Insley (1954–1955)
 Max Spilsbury (1956–1964)
 Andy MacDonald (1965–1968)
 John Symank (1969–1970)
 Ed Peasley (1971–1974)
 Joe Salem (1975–1978)
 Dwain Painter (1979–1981)
 Joe Harper (1982–1984)
 Larry Kentera (1985–1989)
 Steve Axman (1990–1997)
 Jerome Souers (1998–2018)
 Chris Ball (2019- )

References

Lists of college football head coaches

Arizona sports-related lists